This is an incomplete list of the tallest (pinnacle height > 200 metres) man-made structures of any kind that exist or existed in South America.

List

References

Tallest structures
South America
Tallest
Tallest structures